Phallocryptus is a genus of crustaceans within the family Thamnocephalidae.

References 

 "ITIS - Report: Phallocryptus". www.itis.gov. Retrieved 2022-10-14.
 "Explore the Taxonomic Tree". FWS.gov. Retrieved 2022-10-14.

Anostraca